Lafik (also Romanized as Lāfīk; also known as Lāfīnk and Lāpink) is a village in Jask Rural District, in the Central District of Jask County, Hormozgan Province, Iran. At the 2006 census, its population was 221, in 38 families.

References 

Populated places in Jask County